Kursk Magnetic Anomaly is a territory rich in iron ores located within the Kursk, Belgorod, and Voronezh oblasts in Russia, and constitutes a significant part of the Central Chernozyom Region. The Kursk Magnetic Anomaly is recognized as the largest magnetic anomaly on Earth.

The Kursk Magnetic Anomaly (KMA) was first discovered in 1773 by the Russian astronomer and academic Pyotr Inokhodtsev while preparing the maps of the General Land Survey at the behest of the Russian government. It was not investigated again until 1874 when I. N. Smirnov conducted the first geomagnetic survey of European Russia. In 1883, N. D. Pilchikov, an assistant professor at Kharkiv University, conducted a series of 71 observations of the Kursk Magnetic Anomaly. These revealed a much larger extent than previously measured and for the first time attributed the anomaly to the presence of iron ore. In 1884, on the basis of this discovery, Pilchikov was awarded the silver medal of the Russian Geographical Society.

Serious investigation of the economic potential of the anomaly occurred under the leadership of Ivan Gubkin in 1920–1925, originally based upon the possibilities for oil. Rich ores were discovered in the region of the anomaly about 1931. The open pit method is used to mine this ore at the Stoylenskoye, Lebedinskoye, and Mikhailovskoye deposits. Underground mining methods are used for the Korobkovskoye deposit.

See also 
 Stoilensky GOK
Bangui magnetic anomaly
Temagami Magnetic Anomaly
Ishpatina Ridge

References 

Exploration geophysics
Geology of European Russia
Geography of Russia
Magnetic anomalies